Cyana griseilinea is a moth of the subfamily Arctiinae. It is found in Vietnam.

References

Moths described in 1930
Cyana